USS DeKalb County (LST-715) was an  built for the United States Navy during World War II. Named after counties in six states, it was the only U.S. Naval vessel to bear the name.

LST-715 was laid down on 7 June 1944 at Jeffersonville, Indiana by the Jeffersonville Boat & Machine Company; launched on 20 July 1944; sponsored by Mrs. Loudie S. Moffatt; and commissioned on 15 August 1944.

Service history

World War II
During World War II, LST-715 was assigned to the Asiatic-Pacific theater and participated in the following operations: assault and occupation of Iwo Jima (February and March, 1945) and the assault and occupation of Okinawa Gunto (May and June, 1945). Following the war, LST-715 performed occupation duty in the Far East until mid-September 1945. LST-715 was decommissioned on 17 April 1946 at Manicani Island, Republic of the Philippines.

United States Army
The ship was transferred to the United States Army Transportation Corps on 28 June 1946. Commissioned USAT LST-715 on 29 June 1946, the ship was struck from the Naval Vessel Register on 29 September 1947.

Korean War
Reacquired by the Navy on 25 July 1950, the ship was reinstated to the Naval Register on 10 August 1950. Recommissioned USS LST-715 on 30 August 1950, it participated in the following Korean War campaigns: North Korean Aggression (18 September to 2 November 1950), Communist China Aggression (3 November 1950 to 14 January 1951), Inchon Landing (13 to 17 September 1950), UN Counter Offensive (1 to 14 March 1951), Second Korean Winter (11 January to 30 April 1952), and Korean Defense Summer-Fall 1952 (1 May to 6 August 1952). LST-715 was redesignated USS DeKalb County (LST-715) on 1 July 1955.

Military Sea Transportation Service
It was transferred to the Military Sea Transportation Service (MSTS) in December 1965 where it served as USNS DeKalb County (T-LST-715). Placed out of service and again struck from the Naval Register on 1 November 1973, custody was transferred to the United States Maritime Administration (MARAD) for lay up in the National Defense Reserve Fleet at Suisun Bay, California. The ship was disposed of by MARAD on 30 April 1984 to Jon M. Associates, Suisun Bay, Benicia, California for scrapping.
 
LST-715 earned two battle stars for World War II service, and six battle stars during the Korean War.

References

 

1944 ships
Cold War amphibious warfare vessels of the United States
Korean War amphibious warfare vessels of the United States
LST-542-class tank landing ships
Ships built in Jeffersonville, Indiana
DeKalb County, Alabama
DeKalb County, Georgia
DeKalb County, Illinois
DeKalb County, Indiana
DeKalb County, Missouri
DeKalb County, Tennessee
World War II amphibious warfare vessels of the United States
Ships of the United States Army